The Columbia–Shuswap Regional District is a regional district in the Canadian province of British Columbia, located in the Southern Interior region on the Trans-Canada Highway between Vancouver and Calgary, Alberta.  The regional district borders the Province of Alberta across the Rocky Mountains.

Columbia–Shuswap regional district comprises the regions known as the Shuswap Country, which focuses around Shuswap Lake and lies to the north of the Okanagan region, and the northern part of the Columbia Country, namely the "Big Bend" of the valley of the Columbia River from the Town of Golden to the historic City of Revelstoke, British Columbia. (Revelstoke is sometimes referred to as being in the North Kootenay, Golden is usually thought of as being part of the East Kootenay sub-region, the Columbia Valley). The Canada 2006 Census population was 50,141, spread over a land area of 28,929 square km and a water area of over 2,000 square km. The regional district's offices are in Salmon Arm, near the southwest corner of the regional district.

Demographics 

Note: Totals greater than 100% due to multiple origin responses.

Communities

Incorporated Communities
 City of Salmon Arm- 19,705
 City of Revelstoke- 8,275
 Town of Golden- 3,986
 District Municipality of Sicamous- 2,613

Regional District Electoral Areas
Columbia–Shuswap Electoral Area "A" – 3,097
Columbia–Shuswap Electoral Area "B" – 706
Columbia–Shuswap Electoral Area "C"- 7,695
Columbia–Shuswap Electoral Area "D"- 3,899
Columbia–Shuswap Electoral Area "E" – 1,528
Columbia–Shuswap Electoral Area "F" – 2,731
Columbia–Shuswap Electoral Area "G" - Census data not available

Unincorporated Communities

Anglemont- 454
Blind Bay- 1,149
Celista- 408
Craigellachie
Eagle Bay- 528
Falkland- 805
Malakwa- 619
Notch Hill- 515
Ranchero- 971
Scotch Creek- 762
Silver Creek- 1,038
Solsqua — 333
Sorrento- 1,360
Sunnybrae- 699
Swansea Point- 243
Tappen- 773
White Lake- 623

Notes

References

External links

 
Columbia-Shuswap
Shuswap Country
Columbia Country